Patrick Heron  (30 January 1920 – 20 March 1999) was a British abstract and figurative artist, critic, writer, and polemicist, who lived in Zennor, Cornwall.

Heron was recognised as one of the leading painters of his generation. Influenced by Cézanne, Matisse, Braque and Bonnard, Heron made a significant contribution to the dissemination of modernist ideas of painting through his critical writing and primarily his art.

Heron's artworks are most noted for his exploration and use of colour and light. He is known for both his early figurative work and non-figurative works, which over the years looked to explore further the idea of making all areas of the painting of equal importance. His work was exhibited widely throughout his career and while he wrote regularly early in his career, notably for New Statesman and Arts New York, this continued periodically in later years.

Personal life
Born 30 January 1920 at Headingley, Leeds in Yorkshire, Patrick Heron was the eldest child of Thomas Milner Heron and Eulalie Mabel (née Davies). When Patrick Heron was five and his brother Michael (later known as Dom Benedict) was 4 the family moved to Cornwall, where Tom joined Alec Walker at Cryséde to manage and expand the business from artist-designed woodblock prints on silk to include garment-making and retail. The whole family, now four children (Joanna born 1926 and Antony Giles born 1928), moved again in 1929 to Welwyn Garden City where Tom established Cresta Silks. Notable designers including Edward McKnight Kauffer and Wells Coates, Paul Nash and Cedric Morris worked with Cresta, and Patrick also created fabric designs for the firm from his teenage years. At school, Patrick Heron met his future wife, Delia, daughter of Celia and Richard Reiss, a director of the company which founded Welwyn Garden City.

Registered as a conscientious objector in World War II, Heron worked as an agricultural labourer in Cambridgeshire before he was signed off for ill health. He returned to Cornwall to work for Bernard Leach at the Leach Pottery, St Ives, in 1944–45. During this time, he met many leading artists of the St Ives School, including Barbara Hepworth and Ben Nicholson. Reacquainted with Cornwall, Heron spent each summer there until it became his permanent home in 1956 after his purchase and refurbishment of Eagles Nest the year before from Mark Arnold-Forster, a house Heron had lived in during his childhood. He spent the rest of his life here, until he died at home in March 1999.

Patrick and Delia married in 1945 and had two daughters: architect and educator Katharine (1947) and sculptor Susanna (1949).

Heron was appointed a CBE in 1977 under Harold Wilson, but rejected a knighthood under Margaret Thatcher.

Career as a painter 
Heron used that most rare and uncanny of gifts: the ability to invent an imagery that was unmistakably his own, and yet which connects immediately with the natural world as we perceive it, and transforms our vision of it. Like those of his acknowledged masters, Braque, Matisse and Bonnard, his paintings are at once evocations and celebrations of the visible, discoveries of what he called "the reality of the eye".
Heron's early works were strongly influenced by artists including Matisse, Bonnard, Braque and Cézanne. Throughout his career, Heron worked in a variety of media, from the silk scarves he designed for his father's company Cresta from the age of 14, to a stained-glass window for Tate St Ives, but he was foremost a painter working in oils and gouache.

Early years 
Heron first saw the paintings of Cézanne at an exhibition at the National Gallery in 1933, an influence which continued throughout his career. Having seen The Red Studio by Matisse (one of his other significant influences) at the Redfern Gallery in 1943, Heron completed The Piano, which he considered to be his first mature work. His first solo exhibition was held in 1947 at the Redfern Gallery, London. That same year, Heron began a series of portraits of T. S. Eliot, one of which was acquired by the National Portrait Gallery in 1966. In 2013 this highly abstracted portrait was the centre of an exhibition at the gallery, displayed for the first time alongside a selection of Heron's original studies from life and memory from which it was produced.

From 1956 
Heron's permanent move to Eagles Nest above the Cornish village of Zennor in 1956 coincided with his commitment to non-figurative painting and resulted in a very productive period of his work. Its roots can be seen in the Space in Colour exhibition held at Hanover Gallery, London in 1953 where the works of Heron and nine of his British contemporaries were displayed, which he both curated and wrote the catalogue for. His Tachiste paintings made reference to the garden at Eagles Nest, such as Azalea Garden, in the Tate collection.

His 'Stripe' paintings, described by Alan Bowness as being 'suffused with light and colour and full of a positive life-enhancing quality so free and so refreshing' emphasised this move towards the principles of colour. Writing in 1968, Bowness went on to describe how he could 'think of few more disconcerting paintings in the last twenty years than Herons stripe paintings of 1957'. Heron described how the 'vertical touch' of the Tachiste paintings were pushed to the ultimate conclusion, as the lines "became longer and longer, until on one painting in early 1956 they became so long that the strokes touched top and bottom". From 1958 onwards, Heron was represented by Waddington Galleries in London, and in the 1960s he was also represented by the Bertha Schaefer Gallery in New York. When Ben Nicholson moved to Switzerland in 1958, Heron took over his studio at Porthmeor Studios, overlooking the beach at Porthmeor, St Ives, and began to take advantage of the larger space to paint at a bigger scale – first soft-edged and then the self-described "wobbly hard-edge painting", such as Cadmium with Violet, Scarlet, Emerald, Lemon and Venetian: 1969 in the Tate.

From 1979 
The shock of Delia's unexpected death in 1979 meant Heron did little painting for some time. When he did return to the canvas, he turned to the garden at Eagles Nest. Just as it had shown a route to abstraction when Heron first moved there in the 1950s, through it he found a way to reinvigorate his creative approach: rather than rapidly drawing large shapes in pen across the canvas which would then be filled in with a fine Japanese watercolour brush as he had through most of the 1970s, Heron used a large brush, mixed different colours together, and painted from the arm rather than the wrist, allowing the works to develop through the act of painting. This burst of creativity, resulting in paintings such as 28 January: 1983 (Mimosa), formed Heron's Barbican exhibition of 1985.

In 1989 Heron was invited to be artist-in-residence at the museum of New South Wales in Sydney, and this resulted in another highly prolific period of his work. Drawing inspiration from his daily walk to his studio through the city's Botanic Gardens located by the harbour, Heron produced six large paintings and 46 gouaches in sixteen weeks. These works are reactions to real visual experiences, yet are not direct representations; instead the line and colour encapsulate "specific visual realities without ever depicting them".

These intense periods of activity characterised Heron's later career, made obvious through his exhibitions at the Barbican, and another at Camden Arts Centre in 1994. These paintings formed the exhibition entitled 'Big Paintings' that went on to tour Britain. The year before, Heron designed a coloured glass window for the new Tate St Ives with his son-in-law Julian Feary, which opened in 1993. Heron was commissioned to paint a portrait of author AS Byatt (1997), and the following year Tate Gallery, London staged a major retrospective of his work in 1998. This was the most comprehensive exhibition of Heron's work and brought together items from the different decades and periods of his working life. Selected by David Sylvester, the works were displayed so that the last gallery with his late paintings adjoined the first gallery with his earliest works, making explicit how the elements on which Heron's career was founded were already in place. Nicholas Serota, former director of the Tate Gallery, who was a friend as well as patron, described Heron as "one of the most influential figures in post-war British art".

Once the exhibition closed, at the Tate Gallery, London, Heron embarked on a series of 100 gouache paintings, each no bigger than A4. He stopped at 43rd, the number it took to cover the carpet in his sitting room at Eagles Nest.

Career as a critic   
Naturally I like the article [in the New English Weekly] very much indeed – but not only because what you say about my work pleases me, but also because it is criticism that could only come from someone who has practised himself – and responded to the work in the way it was done. Henry MooreDear Mr Heron, I have translated certain sections of your book on paintings which I have read with interest. You throw a new light on those things about which run-of-the-mill criticism is bewildering. My sincere compliments, Georges Braque

Heron was highly acclaimed as a writer as well as an artist, and respected by his contemporaries for being able to articulate art from the perspective of a practitioner. His writing about art began in 1945 when he was invited by Philip Mairet, editor of The New English Weekly, to contribute to the journal. His first published article, on Ben Nicholson, was written while Heron was still at Leach Pottery. This was soon followed by essays on Picasso, Klee, Cézanne and Braque. Within the next two years Heron began broadcasting a series of talks on contemporary art on the BBC World Service and the newly founded Third programme, and wrote regularly for New Statesman. In 1955, he became London Correspondent to Arts Digest, New York (later renamed Arts(NY)), and in the same year a selection of his criticism was published by Routledge as The Changing Forms of Art. In 1958, Heron took a "vow of silence" as a critic, giving up his regular columns as he said he wanted to be a painter who wrote, not a writer who paints.

He did continue to contribute to exhibition catalogues, and wrote some key articles. Notably in 1966, 1968 and 1970 he published a series of articles in Studio International questioning the perceived ascendancy of American artists, at the expense of British and Parisian artists. His final essay on the subject was in a closely worded article of some 14,000 words published over a period of three days in The Guardian in October 1974. He also wrote passionately in defence of the independence and autonomy of English Art Schools against their integration into the polytechnic system. Heron's articles and essays have been republished in collected works, such as "Selected Writings by the Artist" in Patrick Heron (Oxford: 1988), Patrick Heron on Art and Education (Leeds: 1996), and The Colour of Colour (Texas: 1979).

Major solo exhibitions 
Heron exhibited his work throughout his career. Key solo exhibitions include:

 1947  The Redfern Gallery, London [First solo exhibition]
 1952  Wakefield City Art Gallery
 1960  Bertha Schaefer Gallery, New York
 1960  The Waddington Galleries, London
 1963  Galerie Charles Lienhard, Zurich
 1965  Hume Tower, Edinburgh
 1965  VIII Biennal de São Paulo: Gra-Bretanha 1965: Museu de Arte Moderna de São Paulo
 1967  The Richard Demarco Gallery, Edinburgh
 1968  Museum of Modern Art, Oxford
 1972  Whitechapel Art Gallery
 1973  Bonython Art Gallery, Paddington, Sydney, NSW
 1978  The University of Texas Art Museum, Austin, Texas
 1985  Barbican Art Gallery
 1990  Art Gallery of New South Wales, Sydney
 1994  Camden Arts Centre
 1998  Tate Britain
 2018  Tate St Ives
 2018  Turner Contemporary
 2021 Hazlitt Holland-Hibbert 
 2022 Cristea Roberts Gallery

See also 

 List of St Ives artists

References

Sources

External links

 http://www.guardian.co.uk/news/1999/mar/22/guardianobituaries.michaelmcnay
 National Portrait Gallery  Patrick Heron (1920-1999), Painter and art critic

1920 births
1999 deaths
20th-century English painters
Abstract painters
Academics of the Central School of Art and Design
Alumni of the Slade School of Fine Art
Artists from Leeds
English conscientious objectors
British contemporary artists
British contemporary painters
Commanders of the Order of the British Empire
English male painters
People educated at St George's School, Harpenden
St Ives artists
20th-century English male artists